Dulabi-ye Badamak (also Romanized as Dūlābī-ye Bādāmak; also known as Bādāmak) is a village in Miyankuh-e Gharbi Rural District, in the Central District of Pol-e Dokhtar County, Lorestan Province, Iran. At the 2006 census, its population was 148, in 39 families.

References 

Towns and villages in Pol-e Dokhtar County